The European Grand Prix for Choral Singing (in French, Grand Prix Européen de Chant Choral, commonly abbreviated as European Choral Grand Prix or GPE) is an annual choral competition between the winners of six European choral competitions. It was inaugurated in 1989.

Despite its name, the GPE is not limited to European choirs; this is because choirs from any country can join the choral competitions in any of the GPE's member-cities. , one choir from Japan, one choir from Argentina, two choirs from Indonesia, and two choirs from the United States have won the GPE, while two choirs from the Philippines and United States have won the GPE twice. In addition, the contest is not limited to adult choirs; three of the grand prize-winning choirs are children's choirs.

As of 2022, four choirs had won the EGP twice: the University of the Philippines Madrigal Singers (1997 and 2007), APZ Tone Tomšič (2002 and 2008), University of Utah Chamber Choir (renamed from the University of Utah Singers) (2006 and 2015), and Vesna Children's Choir (2000 and 2017).

In the summer of 2019, Youth choir "Kamēr..." became the 1st and currently the only choir having won the EGP three times (2004, 2013, and 2019).

As of 2022, two conductors have won the EGP twice: Stojan Kuret (2002 and 2010) and Avip Priatna (2018 and 2022).

Organizing committee and member cities
The GPE is organized by the organizing committees of the following choral competitions, from which the GPE contenders are selected:

 Concorso Polifónico Guido d'Arezzo (International Guido d'Arezzo Polyphonic Contest) - Arezzo, Province of Arezzo, Italy
 Béla Bartók International Choir Competition - Debrecen, Hajdú-Bihar county, Hungary
 International Choral Competition Gallus Maribor - Maribor, Slovenia
 Certamen Coral de Tolosa (Tolosa Choral Competition) - Tolosa, Basque Country, Spain
 Florilège Vocal de Tours (Tours Vocal Competition) - Tours, Indre-et-Loire, France
 International May Choir Competition «Prof. G. Dimitrov» - Varna, Varna Province, Bulgaria

Each individual contest is usually referred to by the name of its host city instead of the competition's official title. The grand prize winners of each contest are automatically eligible to compete at the GPE.

The hosting of each annual GPE competition is rotated among the six member cities.

History
The European Grand Prix for Choral Singing was created in 1988 through the initiative of the competitions of AREZZO (Italy), DEBRECEN (Hungary), GORIZIA (Italy) and TOURS (France) Two others have also been associated: VARNA (Bulgaria) in 1989, and TOLOSA (Basque Country/Spain) in 1990. In 2008 Gorizia stepped out of the Association and MARIBOR (Slovenia) joined it.

Regulations

Eligibility

As mentioned earlier, the contest is open only to the grand prize winners of the six-member European choral competitions in the previous year. In other words, if a choir wins the grand prize in any of the six cities' choral contests, it is eligible for then next year's GPE. Consequently, this also means that, unlike other choral competitions, the GPE does not solicit participants to the contest; no choir may directly apply or audition in order to join the GPE. If an eligible choir backs out, a substitute choir may take its place; as a penalty, any choir that backs out will not be eligible to compete in any of the six qualifying contests for the next year.

No choir may win the grand prize in more than one qualifying competition in a single year. For example, if a choir is named the grand prize winner in Arezzo, it is automatically disqualified to compete in the contests in the five remaining cities for the rest of the year.

There are no specific regulations prohibiting a former finalist (or even a former laureate) from competing in (or even winning again) the GPE more than once. The Philippine Madrigal Singers (laureate of the 1997 GPE) have won the 2006 Florilège Vocal de Tours, going on to win the Grand Prize in 2007 in Arezzo, Italy.  In the same competition, the Madrigal Singers competed with the Vesna Children's Choir (laureate of the 2000 GPE), who won the grand prize of the 2006 Tolosa competition.

Repertoire and choir membership
Each competing choir is required to sing in the same group/category as they performed in respective competitions. Choirs are encouraged to perform songs from various eras and composers. Songs with accompaniment (by any instrument) are allowed as long as the total length of accompanied songs does not exceed ten (10) minutes. The host city determines the total maximum performance time allowed to each finalist.

Each competing choir is also required to have the same number of singers it had from the qualifying competition, plus or minus ten percent (10%) of that number. The total number of singers per choir may be a minimum of 12 singers and a maximum of 60 singers regardless of the number of voice sections or groups; this is because the eligibility requirements vary for each of the six qualifying competitions. Because of this, it is possible for mixed-voice choirs to compete directly against all-male and all-female choirs; it is also possible for children's choirs to compete against adult choirs (and even win, as in 2000, 2001, 2017, and 2018).

The grand prize winner
The GPE grand prize winner, or laureate, is awarded a diploma, a trophy and additional prizes to be determined by the host city, including a cash prize of up to 4,000 Euros (usually awarded).

The GPE winner is not allowed to compete in any international choral competition, member of the European Grand Prix Association, for two years.

Laureates
The following are the lists of grand prize winners for the European Grand Prix for Choral Singing.

Laureates per year

Laureates per country

Laureates per continent

References

Notes

External links
European Grand Prix for Choral Singing - GPE Official home page
 Official web sites for each member-city:
 Arezzo
 Debrecen
 Maribor
 Tolosa
 Tours
 Varna

European music awards
Classical music festivals in France
Classical music festivals in Italy
Classical music festivals in Hungary
Classical music festivals in Bulgaria
Classical music festivals in Spain
Classical music festivals in Slovenia
Vocal and choral music organizations
Singing competitions
Music festivals staged internationally
Music festivals established in 1989